(died 1 June 1628) was a Roman Catholic prelate who served as Secretary of the Congregation of Rites (1625–1628) and Titular Archbishop of Thessalonica (1623–1628).

Biography
On 10 May 1623, Julius Benigni was appointed during the papacy of Pope Gregory XV as Titular Archbishop of Thessalonica.
On 21 May 1623, he was consecrated bishop by Marco Antonio Gozzadini, Cardinal-Priest of Sant'Eusebio, with Virgilio Cappone, Bishop of Mileto and Alessandro Bosco, Bishop of Gerace, serving as co-consecrators. 
On 8 November 1625, he was appointed during the papacy of Pope Urban VIII as Secretary of the Congregation of Rites.
He served as Secretary of the Congregation of Rites until his death on 1 June 1628.

References

External links and additional sources
 (for Chronology of Bishops (for Chronology of Bishops) 
 (for Chronology of Bishops (for Chronology of Bishops) 

17th-century Roman Catholic titular bishops
Bishops appointed by Pope Gregory XV
Bishops appointed by Pope Urban VIII
1628 deaths